`

Orlando Owoh (14 February 1932 – 4 November 2008) was a highlife musician and band leader.

Biography 
He was born Stephen Oladipupo Olaore Owomoyela in Osogbo, Nigeria on 14 February 1932 to Owomoyela and Mrs. Christiana Morenike Owomoyela. His father hailed from Ifon - Ose Local Govt, Ondo State, while his mother was from Owo. He later became known to his fans as Chief Dr. Orlando Owoh. As a young man Owoh initially entered into the carpentry trade until 1958, when he was hired by Nigeria's Kola Ogunmola Theatre Group to play drums and sing. Owoh went on to form Dr. Orlando Owoh and his Omimah Band in 1960, and over a musical career of forty years became one of the leading proponents of highlife music. With bands such as the Omimah Band and later the Young Kenneries and the African Kenneries International, Owoh remained popular in Nigeria, even as tastes moved to the newer jùjú and fuji styles. He had over 45 albums to his credit. Orlando Owoh died on 4 November 2008 and was laid to rest at his Agege residence in Lagos, Nigeria.

Discography 
Albums released by Dr. Orlando Owoh include (not in chronological order):  
1) Aiye nyi lo (medley)
2) Ajanaku Daraba
3) Apartheid, 
4) Asotito Aye
5) Awa de
6) Ayo mi sese bere 
7) Cain ati Abel
8) Easter special, 
9) E ku iroju
10) E Get As E Be
11) Emi wa wa lowo re
12) Experience
13) Ganja I
14) Ganja II
15) Ibaje eniyan
16) Igba aye Noah
17) Ire loni
18) I say No
19) Iwa l'Oluwa 
20) Iyawo Olele
21) Jeka sise
22) Kangaroo 
23) Kennery de ijo ya
24) Kose mani 
25) Late Dele Giwa 
26) Logba Logba 
27) Ma wo mi roro
28) Message 
29) Mo juba agba 
30) Money 4 hand back 4 ground
31) Oriki Ojo 
32) Orin titun 
33) Thanksgiving 
34) Which is which

His singles include (not in chronological order): 
1) Brother ye se
2) Day by day 
3) Diana 
4) Ebe mo be ori mi
5) Zo Muje
6) Egi nado
7) Elese (sinner)
8) Fiba fun Eledumare
9) Ma pa mi l'oruko da
10) Ma sika Ma doro
11) Modupe (medley) 
12) Oju ni face
13) Okan mi yin Oba orun
14) Olorun Oba da wa lohun (medley) 
15) Oro loko laya
16) Rex Lawson
17) Wa ba mi jo
18) Yabomisa sawale
19) You be my lover.

This list of albums and singles is however not exhaustive.

References

Musicians from Osogbo
1932 births
2008 deaths
Yoruba musicians
20th-century Nigerian male singers
Yoruba-language singers
Burials in Lagos State